Lycoperdon pratense, commonly known as the meadow puffball, is a type of puffball mushroom in the genus Lycoperdon. It is found in Great Britain and Ireland, including the Outer Hebrides, mainland Europe, and occasionally in North America, and is commonly seen in sand dune systems, where it can be abundant in dune slacks as well as in grassland and lawns, as its vernacular name suggests. In the early stages of development its skin is scruffy whereas its bigger relatives have smooth skins; the meadow puffball is edible and has a stump-like stem (to differentiate it from the giant puffball).

References

 
 

Puffballs
pratense